The NCAA Division III Men's Tennis Championship is an annual men's college tennis national collegiate championship sponsored by the National Collegiate Athletic Association (NCAA) for teams in Division III. Team, individual, and doubles championships are awarded each year.

UC Santa Cruz and Kalamazoo are the most successful men's Division III programs, with seven team titles each. 

Emory are the current team champions, with five titles.

History
The championship first began in 1976 after the NCAA divided its membership into its current three-division system in 1973–74. The national championship rounds are contested annually in May.

Champions

Singles, Doubles, and Team (Points) Championships

Singles, Doubles, and Team (Bracket) Championships

Champions

Team titles

Singles titles

Doubles titles

 Schools highlight in yellow have reclassified to another NCAA division.

See also
NCAA Men's Tennis Championships (Division I, Division II)
NAIA Men's Tennis Championship
NCAA Women's Tennis Championships (Division I, Division II, Division III)

References

External links
NCAAsports.com
List of NCAA champions

Tennis Men
Tennis tournaments in the United States
College tennis in the United States